The 17th constituency of the Nord is a French legislative constituency in the Nord département.

Description

Nord's 17th constituency contains the majority of Douai as well as the rural canton of Arleux to the south.

The seat was held by Marc Dolez from 1988 to 2017, with the sole exception of between 1993 and 1997. Dolez left the Socialist Party to join Jean-Luc Mélenchon's Left Party in 2008. At the 2012 election he faced no candidate in the second round following the withdrawal of the Socialist Party candidate.

Historic Representation

Election results

2022

 
 
 
 
 
 
 
 
|-
| colspan="8" bgcolor="#E9E9E9"|
|-

2017

2012

 
 
 
 
 
|-
| colspan="8" bgcolor="#E9E9E9"|
|-
 
 

 
 
 
 

* Withdrew before the 2nd round

2007

 
 
 
 
 
|-
| colspan="8" bgcolor="#E9E9E9"|
|-

2002

 
 
 
 
 
 
|-
| colspan="8" bgcolor="#E9E9E9"|
|-

1997

 
 
 
 
 
 
|-
| colspan="8" bgcolor="#E9E9E9"|
|-

Sources
 Official results of French elections from 1998: 

17